Hedderwick may refer to:

 House Of Hedderwick or Hedderwick Castle, a listed building in Montrose, Angus, Scotland
 James Hedderwick (1814–1897), Scottish poet, journalist and newspaper proprietor
 Mairi Hedderwick (born 1939), Scottish illustrator and author
 Thomas Hedderwick (1850–1918), Scottish politician